"Lemon Tree" is a song by German band Fool's Garden from their third album, Dish of the Day (1995). The band's lead vocalist, Peter Freudenthaler, said that he wrote the song on a Sunday afternoon when he was waiting for his girlfriend who did not come. "Lemon Tree" was released as a single in November 1995 and became an international hit the following year. The song reached number 26 on the UK Singles Chart and remained at number one for four weeks in Germany. It also reached number one in Austria, Iceland, Ireland, Norway, and Sweden.

The band recorded a new version of the song in prior for their 2009 release High Times – The Best of Fools Garden. The singles "Wild Days" and "Suzy" were also re-recorded for this album.

Track listings

European CD single
 "Lemon Tree" – 3:11
 "Finally" – 4:29

European maxi-single and UK CD single
 "Lemon Tree" – 3:11 (3:10 on UK release)
 "Finally" – 4:29 (4:30 on UK release)
 "Spirit '91" (dance-mix) – 4:11 (4:13 on UK release)

US and Canadian CD single
 "Lemon Tree"
 "Take Me"

Australian and New Zealand CD single
 "Lemon Tree" – 3:11
 "Take Me" – 4:20
 "Spirit '91" – 4:11

South African maxi-single
 "Lemon Dance" (single edit) – 3:52
 "Lemon Tree" (club mix) – 6:16

Personnel
 All songs written by Peter Freudenthaler and Volker Hinkel
 Vocals: Peter Freudenthaler
 Bass: Thomas Mangold
 Drums: Ralf Wochele
 Guitar: Volker Hinkel
 Keyboards: Roland Röhl
 Breaking lamp sound: Jorick Bouw
 Artwork: Müller & Steeneck Stuttgart
 Bicchieri: Mattia Tugnoli

Charts

Weekly charts

Year-end charts

Certifications

Release history

Covers and parodies
Dustin the Turkey recorded a Christmas-parody called "Christmas Tree". Taiwanese singer Tarcy Su released covers of the song (in both Mandarin and Cantonese) as did Korean singer Park Hye Kyung. Taiwanese-American singer-songwriter Joanna Wang made a cover of the song in 2011. Korean singer and composer, Kim Hong Joong of the group Ateez, released a cover of the song on 4 May 2022.

Alle Farben and Fool's Garden version

On 8 January 2021, Alle Farben with Fool's Garden released a cover of "Lemon Tree". The song made it into the Polish music charts.

Personnel
From Tidal:
 Lyricist and composer: Peter Freudenthaler and Volker Hinkel
 Producer: Frans Zimmer and 
 Mastering Engineer: Dirk Duderstadt and Marco Duderstadt
 Mixing: Junkx

Charts

Weekly charts

Year-end charts

References

External links
 Lyrics and music

1995 singles
1996 singles
Fools Garden songs
Irish Singles Chart number-one singles
Number-one singles in Austria
Number-one singles in Germany
Number-one singles in Iceland
Number-one singles in Norway
Number-one singles in Sweden
Rock ballads
Songs about loneliness
Universal Records singles